MV Columbia was a passenger motor vessel used on the Arrow Lakes in British Columbia, Canada from 1948 to 1954. She was the Canadian Pacific Railway Company's last vessel of a long line of ships on the Arrow Lakes and she was sold after the retirement of SS Minto to Ivan Horie, who continued a freight service for a few years.

References

Steamboats of the Arrow Lakes
Canadian Pacific Railway